At least three well-known results in mathematics bear the name Schur's lemma:
 Schur's lemma from representation theory
 Schur's lemma from Riemannian geometry
 Schur's lemma in linear algebra says that every square complex matrix is unitarily triangularizable, see Schur decomposition
 Schur test for boundedness of integral operators

See also 
 Schur's theorem
 Schur's property